The Morelia International Film Festival (Spanish: Festival Internacional de Cine de Morelia; FICM) was founded in 2003 in the city of Morelia, Michoacán, México. It is an annual event that takes place during the second week of October.

FICM emerged as a need to create a unique meeting point in México for the cinematographic community, the people of Michoacán, and international filmmakers. The festival's goal is to establish a forum to promote up-and-coming Mexican cinema talents, to create incentives and cultural opportunities for the Mexican and international public, and to display the cultural richness of the state of Michoacán.

The festival has achieved notable prestige and prominence in Mexico as a result of its outreach and growth. It is rapidly becoming known in other parts of the world for its uniqueness and quality.

Award winners (Best Mexican Film)

Special Guests 
Throughout its history, FICM has been privileged to host distinguished guests such as Olivier Assayas, Javier Bardem, Demián Bichir, Alfonso Cuarón, Geraldine Chaplin, Amat Escalante, Stephen Frears, Gael García Bernal, Terry Gilliam, Michel Gondry, Alejandro González Iñárritu, Salma Hayek, Todd Haynes, Werner Herzog, James Ivory, Alejandro Jodorowsky, Abbas Kiarostami, Pablo Larraín, Jennifer Lawrence, Tommy Lee Jones, Diego Luna, Julia Ormond, Marisa Paredes, Sally Potter, Edgar Ramírez, Carlos Reygadas, Robert Rodriguez, Volker Schlöndorff, Steven Soderbergh, Quentin Tarantino, Béla Tarr, Guillermo del Toro, Danny Trejo and Gus Van Sant among others.

Artistic Excellence Award 
In 2018, the festival presented the inaugural lifetime achievement award to director  Alfonso Cuarón prior to a screening of his landmark film Roma. In 2019, the award will be presented to Robert Redford.

Michoacán Tribute 
Every year, FICM honors an important figure of Mexican cinema from the state of Michoacán. In previous years, the festival has paid tribute to the filmmakers Miguel Contreras, Fernando Méndeza and the Alva brothers; the cinematographers Ezequiel Carrasco and José Ortiz Ramos; the actors Julio Alemán and Damián Alcázar; and the actresses Stella Inda and Lilia Prado.

Critics’ Week 
Since its beginning in 2003, FICM established a solid partnership with the Critics’ Week of the Cannes Film Festival, which has promoted Mexican filmmakers such as Alejandro Gonzalez Iñárritu, Guillermo del Toro and Fernando Eimbcke. A selection of films from the Critics’ Week is presented each year at FICM with the presence of some of their participants. Likewise, the Critics’ Week shows some of winning films from FICM.

Academy Awards 
Since 2008, the Academy of Motion Picture Arts and Sciences (AMPAS) of the United States officially recognized FICM by offering the winning fiction, documentary and animation short films at Morelia the opportunity to be considered for an Oscar® nomination.

Parallel Activities 
Once the activities in Morelia have ended, the festival presents the winning short films, documentaries and feature films, as well as a careful selection of films shown outside of competition, at different Mexico City venues. Film series, outdoor screenings, conferences, round tables and exhibitions in Morelia, Pátzcuaro and Mexico City complete FICM’s year-round activities.

See also

 Film festivals in North and Central America
 Premio Cuervo Tradicional

References

External links 

 Morelia International Film Festival official website 

Film festivals in Mexico
Autumn events in Mexico